Chinese Education Improving Institute is a Chinese education institution founded in 1921, with the aim of investigating the status of Chinese education and to improve it.

Background and founding
After the failure of Jiawu Sino-Japanese War, China faced an unprecedented turbulent situation, which led to the awakening of pioneers in educational areas. On December 23, 1921, the New Education Co-evolution Institute, New Education Magazine Institute and Practical Education Investigation Institute established Chinese Education Improving Institute together, Meng Lu, Liang Qichao, Yan Xiu, Zhang Zhongren, Li Shizeng Cai Yuanpei, Fan Yuanyuan, Guo Bingwen, Huang Yanpei, Wang Jingwei, Xiong Xiling, Zhang Boweling, Li Xiangchen and Yuan Xitao were nominated as directors, and Tao Xinzhi was hired as Director General. It was the largest educational group at that time, which aims to "investigate the actual situation of education, research education, and strive to improve education", and effectively promoted the process of scientization, democratization and globalization in China’s education. After the reestablishment in 2011, there are now over 300 members in Chinese Education Improving Institute which has formed a platform for mutual improvement and mutual encouragement among educators, non-profit, specialized third-party think tanks.

On December 23, 1921, the New Education Co-evolution Institute, New Education Magazine Institute and Practical Education Investigation Institute together established Chinese Education Improving Institute which aims to "investigate the actual situation of education, research education, and strive to improve education". Meng Lu, Liang Qichao, Yan Xiu, Zhang Zhongren, Li Shizeng, Cai Yuanpei, Fan Yuanyuan, Guo Bingwen, Huang Yanpei, Wang Jingwei, Xiong Xiling, Zhang Boweling, Li Xiangchen and Yuan Xitao were nominated as directors.

The first board meeting was held in February 1922 in Shanghai, Fan Yuanlian was voted as the first chairman, and Tao Xingzhi was nominated as Director General. Chinese Education Improvement Institute was the largest educational community at that time. It held annual meetings in Jinan, Beijing, Nanjing and Taiyuan, participated in world education conferences and established the China Association for the Promotion of Civilian Education. It also published New Education and New Education Review and founded Xiaozhuang Experimental Village Normal School. Principal members were many famous educationists including Hushi, Zhang Pengchun, Chen Heqin, etc.
Since the establishment of Chinese Education Improvement Institute, Chinese education accelerated the process of modernization which was suspended because of the wars then.

Taiyuan Annual Conference and Education to save the country

On August 17, 1925, the annual conference was held in Taiyuan and over 700 participants attended this meeting. Ma Yinchu, Ye Gongchuo attended the meeting and delivered a speech. Over 90 cases were discussed and decided. For instance, defining the educational cases according to nationalism, carrying out military training in school, regulations of treatment at all levels of school staff, promotion of Tibetan culture and so on. 
The congress proposed in accordance with the case of the definite educational purpose of nationalism: China's current education aims to cultivate patriotic people based on the state. The congress believes that there are several points to achieve this, firstly, Chinese should pay attention to the culture of our own country to inspire the independent thinking of national development; secondly, to carry out military education so as to develop a strong body; thirdly, national shame education should be properly used to cultivate patriotic feelings; and fourthly, to promote science education to gain basic knowledge.

Rural education for the benefit of civilians
On December 3, 1926, China Education Improvement Association released the Declaration on the Reform of the National Rural Education, which said, "Our rural education policy requires that rural schools be centers of rural life reform and rural teachers do the soul of rural life reform. We advocate the production of rural center schools from the actual rural life and rural teachers from rural center schools. The main purpose of rural teachers is to create a teacher with a farmer's skill, a scientific mind and a spirit of social transformation. Such teachers will be able to run the best schools with the least amount of money. We are convinced that they can implement the principle of unity of teaching to lead students to learn the skills to conquer nature and transform society. But to achieve this universal realization of education, we must have the talents of testing, researching, investigating, popularizing and guiding people, organizations, plans, funds, and repeated attempts to succeed. The association has a very wide range of businesses, but one of its major missions in the future is to implement the rural education policy and serve our three million four hundred million peasants. We have already made up our mind to raise one million yuan fund, collect one million comrades, promote one million schools and transform one million villages. This is a great undertaking for construction and all nationals bear the utmost responsibility for it."

On December 1, 1927, Republic Daily published, Chinese rural education movement spot which is edited by Tao Xingzhi and translated by Zhang Zonglin. This is a report sent by the Chinese representative to the World Education Conference in Canada. The editorial emphasizes that rural education in China is a major event for one-fifth of the world's population, but the situation of rural education in China is not satisfactory. To this end, China Education Improvement Society has formulated a plan to transform rural education in China, ready to be phased in three stages. The report elaborates on the details of this plan and introduces the situation of carrying out rural education campaigns in Xiaozhuang, Nanjing.

Restoration
On December 23, 2011, the restoration and reestablishment conference of Chinese Education Improvement Institute was held in Beijing. Educational professors and scholars from National Institute Of Education Sciences, Peking University, Renmin University of China, Tsinghua University and Beijing Normal University, people from all walks of life and members of the media attended the conference. One of the promoters is the researcher Chu Chaohui from National Institute of Education Improvement.

Educational Communication and Publication: catered for sub forums of 2014 WISE in Qatar; annual conference session of Chinese Education Improving Development; Psychological Education in Elementary and Secondary Schools; educator spirit series; education philanthropy and CSR consultation.

Consultants and directors

The counselors and directors of CEII are from diverse backgrounds, such as UNESCO, China Law Society, Chinese Writers Association, Peking University and so on.

Modern Education Reform in China

Meng Lu, Liang Qichao, Tao Xingzhi, Hu Shih, Cai Yuanpei, Huang Yanpei, Chen Heqin, Xiong Xiling, Zhang Boling, Zhang Pengchun, Fan Yuanyuan, Guo Bingwen, Li Xiangchen, Yuan Xitao, Yan Xiu, Zhang Zhongren, Li Shizeng reformed and constructing modern Chinese education, founded Xiaozhuang Experimental Village Normal School and China Association for the Promotion of Civilian Education, published New Education and New Education Review
Scientific education
In December 1922, professor Michael, an expert on education measurement in the USA, was invited by CEII to come to China to help compile various educational tests and train relevant personnel.

See also 

 Cai Yuanpei

References

Educational organizations based in China
1921 establishments in China